is a role-playing and sports video game for the Wii developed and published by Level-5. It was released on July 16, 2011 in Japan, and was released on September 28, 2012 in Europe.

Development
The game was originally scheduled to release on April 28, 2011. However, on March 15, 2011, Level-5 announced that the game's release date in Japan would be pushed off to Summer 2011 "in order to not drop the quality and produce a title that can also be enjoyed by players who haven't played a soccer game before", according to a statement released by the company.

Reception

Matt Purslow of GameSpot gave the game a score of 5, saying that money would be better spend on Mario Strikers Charged or similar games, because this one have is repetitive when it comes to voice sound and personality-less characters.

Adam Riley of Cubed3 praised the multiplayer option, but criticized the minigames.

References

External links
Official site 

2011 video games
Level-5 (company) games
Association football video games
Nintendo games
Video games developed in Japan
Wii-only games
Role-playing video games
Inazuma Eleven video games
Wii games
Video games scored by Yasunori Mitsuda
Pack-in video games